Acting Up may refer to:

Film and TV
 Acting Up (1978) Marlena Shaw
Acting Up, episode of Make Me a Supermodel (season 1)
Acting Up, episode of Trapped (Australian TV series)
Acting Up" (Season 1, Episode 9) Living Lohan Lindsay Lohan 2008

Music
"Acting Up", song by Kaiser Chiefs from Good Days Bad Days
"Actin' Up", song by Maybach Music Group from Self Made Vol. 2
"Actin' Up", song by Asher Roth, Rye Rye, Chris Brown, Justin Bieber discography The Greenhouse Effect Vol. 2 2013 
"Actin' Up", song by Miranda Lambert from Palomino.

Other uses
Acting up, a variant of the psychological term "acting out", relating to (often) anti-social behaviour